The Branson School (also known as Branson, Branson School, or KBS) is a co-educational college-preparatory high school for students in grades 9–12.

History

In 1916, a group of 15 families in Marin County, California, pooled resources to start a local private school. The Little Gray School was finished in 1917. It began as a coeducational primary school, for students in grades 1–4. In 1918 it added intermediate and upper levels, both of which were limited to girls, and was renamed the San Rafael School for Girls.

In April 1920, the school's trustees appointed two co-headmistresses, Katharine Fleming Branson and her sister Laura Elizabeth Branson. The elder of the two sisters, Katharine Fleming Branson, was Associate Director of Studies at the Beard School in Orange, New Jersey. Laura Elizabeth Branson was a teacher of mathematics and science at The Shipley School in Bryn Mawr, Pennsylvania, and had formerly served as head of the Department of Mathematics at Rosemary Hall in Greenwich, Connecticut. Both sisters were cum laude graduates of Bryn Mawr College.

One former student has alleged that the school condoned teacher and student relationships. There was also a law firm report that illustrated the permissive culture of the school.  The school initially seemed to take the investigation seriously, however there's no comment about it on this page. The actual report that named sex offenders sparked an investigation at University High School where the coach Randy Taylor was employed after Branson.

Coeducation
The division of the two schools by gender started to become obsolete by the 1980s, as the two schools shared faculty, trustees, and curriculum. In July 1985, The Katharine Branson School and the Mount Tamalpais School were merged as a coeducational private day school, The Branson School. Today the school is approximately evenly composed of boys and girls.

Campus facilities

Academic facilities
The Tallant Science Center is home to most science classes at Branson. The center is 6,000 square feet, and contains science labs, prep spaces and storage rooms.
New Oaks contains most of the mathematics and language classes at Branson.
Study Hall is composed of English and History classrooms, and a computer lab.

Athletic Facilities
The Athletics Center at Branson contains two gyms and a workout facility.
The Tom Ryan Field is a full-size turf field dedicated to Branson Soccer Coach Tom Ryan.

The Gym at Branson has a new court and an old court

Student facilities
The Academic Quad is an open quadrangle surrounded by most of the classrooms at the school.
The Jewett Theater is a theater used for plays and assembly.
The Student Commons is an LEED Platinum-certified common area for students.
The Rand Center is a center committed to providing a learning resource for students; the center is dedicated to Allen Rand.

Notable alumni
Julia Child ('30) - chef, television personality, and author of Mastering the Art of French Cooking
Edie Sedgwick (left '56) - socialite, actress, model, and 'It' girl of 1965 (briefly attended, transferred)
Hans Baldauf ('77) - architect
Michael Froman ('80) - lawyer and politician, served as the U.S. Trade Representative from 2013 to 2017.
Elisabeth Leamy ('85?) - television journalist, author and speaker, investigative correspondent for The Dr. Oz Show
Tony Hsieh ('91) - internet entrepreneur and venture capitalist, CEO of Zappos
Jennifer Siebel ('92) - documentary filmmaker and actress, director, writer and producer of the film Miss Representation
Jonny Moseley ('93) - freestyle skier and television presenter, won gold medal in moguls at the 1998 Nagano Winter Olympic Games
Jack Conte ('02) - CEO and co-founder of Patreon, and singer and instrumentalist in Pomplamoose
R. David Edelman ('03) - American policymaker and Special Assistant to President Barack Obama for Economic and Technology Policy
Zio Ziegler ('06) - painter and muralist
Javier Zamora ('08) - Salvadoran-American poet and activist

References

Educational institutions established in 1920
High schools in Marin County, California
Private high schools in California
Preparatory schools in California
1920 establishments in California
Boarding schools in California